Zatrephes novicia is a moth in the family Erebidae. It was described by William Schaus in 1921. It is found in French Guiana and Brazil.

Subspecies
Zatrephes novicia novicia (French Guiana)
Zatrephes novicia rufobrunnea Rothschild, 1909 (Brazil)

References

Phaegopterina
Moths described in 1921